Belenois crawshayi, Crawshay's white, is a butterfly in the family Pieridae. It is found in Angola, Tanzania, Zambia, Malawi, Rwanda, Burundi, the western part of the Democratic Republic of the Congo, western Kenya and Uganda. The habitat consists of woodland and forest margins.

The larvae feed on Capparis species.

References

External links
Seitz, A. Die Gross-Schmetterlinge der Erde 13: Die Afrikanischen Tagfalter. Plate XIII 13

Butterflies described in 1894
Pierini
Butterflies of Africa